Maria Teresa Cybo-Malaspina (29 June 1725  29 December 1790) was the sovereign Duchess of Massa and Princess of Carrara from 1731 until her death in 1790. She was the eldest child of Alderano I, Duke of Massa and Carrara, and his wife Ricciarda Gonzaga.

Life

Childhood 
Maria Teresa was born on 29 June 1725 in Novellara. She was the daughter of Duke Alderano I Cybo-Malaspina (1690-1731) and his wife, Countess  (1698-1768). As the eldest child, she was her father's primary heiress. Her father died on 18 August 1731, when she was just six years old.

Marriage 
Maria Teresa was married by proxy on 10 November 1734 to Eugenio Giovanni Francesco of Savoy, a grandson of Prince Louis Thomas of Savoy-Carignan. However, as Eugenio died only thirteen days later, the couple never met and the marriage was annulled on the grounds of it never having been consummated.

In 1741, she married Ercole Rinaldo d'Este, heir to the Duchy of Modena and Reggio. The Duchy of Massa and the Principality of Carrara were then annexed to the Duchy of Modena and Reggio. The marriage was not happy, and Ercole would have affairs.

The Holy Roman Empress Maria Theresa arranged for Maria Beatrice, Maria Teresa’s daughter and only surviving child, to marry the empress' son Archduke Ferdinand Karl. In Milan on 15 October 1771, the two married. From this marriage, the House of Austria-Este was created, a cadet branch of the House of Habsburg-Lorraine, which ruled Modena between 1814 and 1859.

Death 
Maria Teresa died on 29 December 1790 in Modena, at the age of 65. Her non-sovereign titles, Duchess di Ajello and Baroness di Paduli, as well as that of Sovereign Lady of Moneta, went to her daughter.

Family
Maria Teresa and Ercole III had 2 children:

Maria Beatrice Ricciarda (7 April 1750  14 November 1829); married Archduke Ferdinand Karl in 1771, and became the Archduchess of Austria-Este. Had issue.
Rinaldo Francesco (4 January 1753  5 May 1753); died in infancy.

Ancestry

Notes

1725 births
1790 deaths
Maria Teresa
18th-century women rulers
18th-century Italian people
18th-century Italian women
Maria Teresa
Duchesses of Massa
Princesses of Carrara
Maria Teresa
Hereditary Princesses of Modena
People from the Province of Reggio Emilia